Notis Peryalis (16 August 1920 – 10 November 2009) was a Greek actor. He appeared in more than thirty films from 1953 to 1983.

Selected filmography

References

External links 

1920 births
2009 deaths
Greek male film actors
People from Laconia